Jaswinder Kaur is an Indian pilot  born in Kharar, SAS Nagar Punjab.

References

People from Sahibzada Ajit Singh Nagar district
Living people
Indian women commercial aviators
Year of birth missing (living people)